The 2023 Gardner–Webb Runnin' Bulldogs football team will represent Gardner–Webb University as a member of the Big South Conference during the 2023 NCAA Division I FCS football season. Led by fourth-year head coach Tre Lamb, the Runnin' Bulldogs play their home games at the Ernest W. Spangler Stadium in Boiling Springs, North Carolina.

Previous season

The Runnin' Bulldogs finished the 2022 season with an overall record of 7–6 and a mark of 5–0 in conference play to place in first in the Big South. They also reached three milestones for the program in the 2022 season. For the first time since 2003, Gardner-Webb won the Big South championship. With it, they clinched an automatic bid to the NCAA Division I Football Championship, their first playoff appearance as an FCS team and first as a program since the 1992 NAIA playoffs. Their best season in 19 years would be further added on with a win over Eastern Kentucky in the first round of the playoffs, their first FCS playoff win in program history. They would ultimately fall to William & Mary in the second round.

Schedule

Game summaries

at Appalachian State

Elon

at Tennessee State

at East Carolina

Robert Morris

at Austin Peay

Eastern Kentucky

UT Martin

at Bryant

at Tennessee Tech

Charleston Southern

References

Gardner-Webb
Gardner–Webb Runnin' Bulldogs football seasons
Gardner-Webb Runnin' Bulldogs football